Helmut Wirnsberger (born in Steyr) was a sniper in the 3rd Mountain Division on the Eastern Front of the Second World War, and was credited with 64 kills.

Wirnsberger was sent to the Eastern Front in September 1942, and fought with both a K-98 and a Gewehr 43 after sniper training in the Seetaler Alpen.

After being wounded, Wirnsberger was reassigned to teach courses on sniper training.

References

Gebirgsjäger of World War II
Austrian military personnel of World War II
German military snipers
People from Steyr
German Army personnel of World War II